John Kevin Crotty (born July 15, 1969) is an American former professional basketball player. A 6'1" point guard from the University of Virginia, Crotty was undrafted, but played in 11 National Basketball Association (NBA) seasons from 1992 to 2003. After retiring from the NBA, Crotty moved into sports broadcasting with the Miami Heat.

Basketball career

High school
Crotty was a McDonald's All-American and second-team Parade All-American averaging 23 points, 5 assists, 3 rebounds and 3 steals a game as a senior for Christian Brothers Academy in Lincroft, New Jersey. He was recruited by Notre Dame, North Carolina, Stanford, Villanova and Virginia, but ultimately decided on Virginia.

College
Crotty holds Virginia's record for assists in a season with 214 (1989–90). Crotty previously held Virginia's record for most career assists at 683, but was moved to second place upon being surpassed by Kihei Clark on February 18, 2023. He scored 1,646 points and recorded 12 double-doubles in points and assists during his Virginia career.  Crotty was a third-team All-ACC selection in 1990 and 1991. He was a first-team All-ACC Tournament choice in 1991 and a second-team All-ACC Tournament selection in 1990. He also earned honorable mention All-America honors from The Associated Press and The Sporting News in 1990.

NBA
Crotty played for the Utah Jazz, Cleveland Cavaliers, Miami Heat, Portland Trail Blazers, Seattle SuperSonics, Detroit Pistons and Denver Nuggets. In his NBA career, Crotty played in 477 games and scored a total of 1,903 points. After retiring from professional basketball, Crotty became a sports analyst for the Miami Heat.  Crotty is also a Principal in the Miami office of Avison Young.

During his playing days, when making a long basket it was sometimes playfully called a 'Crotty Chop', a play on 'Karate Chop'.

Broadcasting career
Crotty became the Miami Heat's radio analyst in 2005. In November 2017, Crotty was selected to replace Tony Fiorentino as the team's television analyst.

NBA career statistics

Regular season

|-
| style="text-align:left;"| 
| style="text-align:left;"| Utah
| 40 || 0 || 6.1 || .514 || .143 || .684 || .4 || 1.4 || .3 || .0 || 2.6
|-
| style="text-align:left;"| 
| style="text-align:left;"| Utah
| 45 || 0 || 7.0 || .455 || .458 || .861 || .7 || 1.7 || .3 || .0 || 2.9
|-
| style="text-align:left;"| 
| style="text-align:left;"| Utah
| 80 || 0 || 12.7 || .403 || .306 || .810 || 1.2 || 2.6 || .5 || .1 || 3.7
|-
| style="text-align:left;"| 
| style="text-align:left;"| Cleveland
| 58 || 4 || 10.6 || .447 || .296 || .861 || .9 || 1.8 || .4 || .1 || 3.0
|-
| style="text-align:left;"| 
| style="text-align:left;"| Miami
| 48|| 0 || 13.7 || .513 || .408 || .844 || 1.0 || 2.1 || .4 || .0 || 4.8
|-
| style="text-align:left;"| 
| style="text-align:left;"| Portland
| 26 || 2 || 14.6 || .322 || .300 || .941 || 1.2 || 2.4 || .4 || .0 || 3.7
|-
| style="text-align:left;"| 
| style="text-align:left;"| Portland
| 3 || 0 || 6.3 || .500 || 1.000 || 1.000 || .3 || 1.7 || .7 || .0 || 4.0
|-
| style="text-align:left;"| 
| style="text-align:left;"| Seattle
| 24 || 0 || 15.1 || .405 || .371 || .851 || 1.3 || 2.4 || .4 || .0 || 6.1
|-
| style="text-align:left;"| 
| style="text-align:left;"| Detroit
| 69 || 0 || 13.6 || .422 || .413 || .860 || 1.1 || 1.9 || .4 || .1 || 4.7
|-
| style="text-align:left;"| 
| style="text-align:left;"| Utah
| 31 || 0 || 8.5 || .338 || .571 || .895 || .9 || 1.1 || .2 || .0 || 2.1
|-
| style="text-align:left;"| 
| style="text-align:left;"| Utah
| 41 || 0 || 19.6 || .471 || .449 || .864 || 1.8 || 3.4 || .5 || .0 || 6.9
|-
| style="text-align:left;"| 
| style="text-align:left;"| Denver
| 12 || 0 || 15.0 || .341 || .308 || .600 || 1.3 || 2.4 || .3 || .0 || 3.4
|- class="sortbottom"
| style="text-align:center;" colspan=2| Career
| 477 || 6 ||  12.1 || .431 || .384 || .837 || 1.1 || 2.1 || .4 || .0 || 4.0

Playoffs

|-
| style="text-align:left;"| 1993
| style="text-align:left;"| Utah
| 1 || 0 || 3.0 || 1.000 || – || – || 1.0 || 1.0 || .0 || .0 || 4.0
|-
| style="text-align:left;"| 1994
| style="text-align:left;"| Utah
| 8 || 0 || 4.8 || .364 || 1.000 || 1.000 || .4 || 1.1 || .1 || .0 || 1.5
|-
| style="text-align:left;"| 1995
| style="text-align:left;"| Utah
| 3 || 0 || 8.0 || .667 || – || .600 || .0 || 2.0 || .3 || .0 || 2.3
|-
| style="text-align:left;"| 1996
| style="text-align:left;"| Cleveland
| 2 || 0 || 4.5 || – || – || 1.000 || .5 || .5 || .5 || .5 || 1.0
|-
| style="text-align:left;"| 1997
| style="text-align:left;"| Miami
| 15 || 0 || 8.9 || .394 || .417 || .857 || .7 || .7 || .3 || .0 || 2.5
|-
| style="text-align:left;"| 2000
| style="text-align:left;"| Detroit
| 3 || 0 || 17.0 || .200 || .000 || 1.000 || 1.3 || 1.3 || .3 || .3 || 2.0
|-
| style="text-align:left;"| 2001
| style="text-align:left;"| Utah
| 4 || 0 || 4.8 || .000 || – || 1.000 || .8 || .8 || .3 || .3 || .8
|- class="sortbottom"
| style="text-align:center;" colspan=2| Career
| 36 || 0 || 7.5 || .371 || .412 || .857 || .6 || 1.0 || .3 || .1 || 2.0

References

External links
 Avison Young
 

1969 births
Living people
American expatriate basketball people in Italy
American men's basketball players
American real estate businesspeople
Basketball players from New Jersey
Christian Brothers Academy (New Jersey) alumni
Cleveland Cavaliers players
Denver Nuggets players
Detroit Pistons players
McDonald's High School All-Americans
Miami Heat announcers
Miami Heat players
Parade High School All-Americans (boys' basketball)
People from Orange, New Jersey
Point guards
Portland Trail Blazers players
Seattle SuperSonics players
Sportspeople from Essex County, New Jersey
Undrafted National Basketball Association players
Utah Jazz players
Virginia Cavaliers men's basketball players